William James Hushion (November 3, 1883 – January 29, 1954)  was a Canadian businessman and politician.

Born in Montreal, Quebec, the son of Daniel Hushion and Margaret Phelan, he started working with his father and eventually started his own company, W. J. Hushion. He worked as a grain mercant, and was president of Dominion Distilleries  Montreal Transfer Terminal Ltd., Seven Industries Ltd. and Clinton Distilleries Corporation, as well as vice-president of Montreal Distilleries Corporation.
He was a director of several other companies: Hushion and Hushion Ltd., Canada Catering Co. Ltd., Rock Product Co. Ltd., Wesh Coal Corporation, Nu-Way Box Co. Ltd. and Quebec Flour Mills.  He was listed as a promoter of  Montreal and Quebec Products Exchanges Inc. He also volunteered with hospital boards, and was named governor for life of Hôpital Notre-Dame in 1923 and of St. Mary's Hospital in 1924. He was a member of several clubs, including Club de réforme,  Mount Stephen Club, Club Saint-Denis, Club canadien, Club Senneville and Shamrock Athletic Association.

In 1916, he was defeated as a Liberal Party of Quebec candidate in the riding of Montréal–Sainte-Anne in the 1916 Quebec provincial election. He was also defeated as a Liberal Party of Canada candidate in the riding of St. Antoine in the 1917 federal election. He served on Montreal City Council from 1914 to 1928. He was elected in 1923 to the Quebec Legislative Assembly in the riding of Montréal–Sainte-Anne. He resigned in 1924 and was elected to the House of Commons of Canada in the riding of St. Antoine in a 1924 by-election. He was defeated in 1925 and 1930. He was re-elected in the 1935 federal election in the riding of St. Ann. He was summoned to the Senate of Canada in 1940 in the senatorial division of Victoria, Quebec. He served until his death in 1954. He is buried in the Notre Dame des Neiges Cemetery.

The Bain Hushion, a public bath at 757, rue des Seigneurs in Montreal, was named after him. The building was damaged by fire and permanently closed in 1988, but will be renovated into housing for aboriginal women.

He had a son, also named William James Hushion, who married Marielle Herdt. That couple had a son, William J. Hushion (April 16, 1940 – April 8, 2020), who owned a book distribution company, Hushion House.

References

External links
 
 

1883 births
1954 deaths
Businesspeople from Montreal
Canadian senators from Quebec
Liberal Party of Canada MPs
Liberal Party of Canada senators
Members of the House of Commons of Canada from Quebec
Quebec Liberal Party MNAs
Burials at Notre Dame des Neiges Cemetery
Montreal city councillors